The Cuenca Alimentadora del Distrito Nacional de Riego 026 Bajo Río San Juan is a protected area in northeastern Mexico. It extends over part of the northern Sierra Madre Occidental, near the cities of Monterrey and Saltillo.

Geography
The protected area covers an area of 1971.57 km2, which includes much of the northern Sierra Madre Oriental. It adjoins Cumbres de Monterrey National Park to the north, Serranía de Zapalinamé ecological reserve to the west, and Cerro el Potosí ecological reserve on the southeast.

The protected area protects the headwaters of the San Juan River, which supplies water to the Monterrey Metropolitan Area, Mexico's second most populous, and the agricultural lower Rio Grande valley.

Flora and fauna
The natural vegetation is pine–oak forest at higher elevations. pines and/or oaks are the dominant trees, forming dense forests or open woodlands. There are also groves of oyamel fir (Abies vejarii) and Mexican Douglas-fir or ayarín (Pseudotsuga menziesii var. lindleyana).

Lower elevations are warmer and dryer, and home to chaparral, submontane matorral, desert matorral (microphyll and rosetophyll), secondary scrubland, and agriculture.

Conservation
The area was designated a protected forest area and watershed in 1949. It was redesignated a natural resources protection area in 2002.

References

Protected areas of the Sierra Madre Oriental
Protected areas of Coahuila
Protected areas of Nuevo León
Natural resources protection areas of Mexico